"Magic Touch " is the eighth single by English R&B band Loose Ends from their second studio album, So Where Are You?, and was released in May 1985 by Virgin Records. In the group's native UK, the single reached number 16. It is the opening track from the album.

Track listing

7” Single: VS761 
 "Magic Touch"
 "Magic Touch" (Instrumental)

12” Single: VS761-12
 "Magic Touch" (Club Mix) 6.19
 "Magic Touch" (Instrumental) 5.00

2nd 12” Single: VS761-12 Limited Edition Gatefold Sleeve
 "Magic Touch" (Club Mix)  6.19
 "Magic Touch" (Instrumental)  5.oo
 "Emergency [Dial 999] (Dub Mix)
 "Tell Me What You Want" (Extended Version)

3rd 12” Single: VS761-13
 "Magic Touch" (Vibes Version) feat. Roy Ayres
 "Magic Touch" (Vibes Instrumental) feat. Roy Ayres

Chart performance

Magic Touch 1992

"Magic Touch" was remixed and re-released in 1992. This and the additional tracks "A Little Spice" and "Choose Me" were taken from the Loose Ends Remix project "Tighten Up Volume 1".

Track listing

7” Single: TEN409 
 "Magic Touch" (7" Edit)  3.57
 "Magic Touch" (Original 7" Version)

12” Single: TENX409
 "Magic Touch" (12" Remix)  6.12
 "Magic Touch" (Original 12" Version / Club Mix)  6.19
 "Choose Me" (Eon Irving Mix / Sly's Eastern Promise Mix) 
 "A Little Spice" (Gang Starr Remix)  5.18

CD Single: TENCD409
 "Magic Touch" (7" Edit)  3.57
 "Magic Touch" (12" Remix)  6.12
 "Magic Touch" (Original 12" Version / Club Mix)  6.19
 "A Little Spice" (Gang Starr Remix)  5.18

Charts

References

External links
 Magic Touch (1985) at Discogs.

1985 singles
Loose Ends (band) songs
Song recordings produced by Nick Martinelli
Songs written by Carl McIntosh (musician)
Songs written by Jane Eugene
Songs written by Steve Nichol
1985 songs